T-Hrvatski Telekom d.d. is a Croatian telecommunications company. Since its initial public offering in October 2007, T-Hrvatski Telekom shares have traded on the Zagreb Stock Exchange, with global depositary receipts trading on the London Stock Exchange until 2014. As of 2016, Deutsche Telekom AG owned 51% of T-HT's shares, with the Raiffeisen Mandatory Pension Funds, Croatian War Veterans’ Fund and the Croatian government's Restructuring and Sale Center holding 8.9%, 6.7% and 2.9% respectively. The remaining free float was in the hands of private investors.

The company offers fixed telephony, broadband internet, IPTV, and mobile telephony as its main services.

History 
The company was founded on 28 December 1998 after the separation of the Croatian Post and Telecommunications into two entities: Croatian Post and Croatian Telecom, which started their business operations on 1 January 1999.

In October 1999, Deutsche Telekom purchased a 35% stake in Hrvatski Telekom for $850 million and in 2001 purchased an additional 16% stake in Hrvatski Telekom which combined was a 51% stake.

In 2002, HT-mobilne komunikacije d.o.o. (later T-Mobile Croatia d.o.o.) was registered as a separate company, a subsidiary owned by Hrvatske telekomunikacije d.d., in order to provide mobile telephone services.

T-HT has a 39.1% share in the Bosnian HT Mostar (and its subsidiary of Eronet).

In 2010, an independent business department for inpatient and mobile communications were combined under the auspices of Hrvatski Telekom. Previously, the mobile connection appeared on the market along with the Cronet mobile network as an independent subsidiary of Hrvatski Telekom Mobile, and from October 2004 as a T-Mobile Croatia. At the end of 2011, the company reported for sale by 8.067 billion with 6399 employees. To reach HRK.

Subsidiaries 
 Iskon Internet
 Combis
 Evo TV
 Crnogorski Telekom (Montenegro)
 HT Eronet (Bosnia and Herzegovina)

References

External links
 Official web site
 Official corporate web site

Deutsche Telekom
Telecommunications companies of Croatia
Companies listed on the Zagreb Stock Exchange
Telecommunications companies established in 1998
Companies based in Zagreb
Croatian companies established in 1998